The Admonitions is a mirror for princesa literary work summarizing the principles of governmentcompleted in the 1010s or 1020s for King Stephen I of Hungary's son and heir, Emeric. About a century later, Bishop Hartvik claimed that Stephen I himself wrote the small book. Modern scholarship has concluded that a foreign cleric who was proficient in rhymed Latin prose compiled the text. The cleric has been associated with a Saxon monk, Thangmar; with the Venetian Bishop Gerard of Csanád; and with Archbishop Astrik of Esztergom.

References

Sources 

1010s books
1020s books
Medieval documents of Hungary
Mirrors for princes